Jovan Kantul (1592 – d. 1614), sometimes numbered Jovan II was the Archbishop of Peć and Serbian Patriarch, the spiritual leader of the Serbian Orthodox Church, from 1592 until his death in 1614. He planned a major revolt in the Ottoman Balkans, with Grdan, the vojvoda of Nikšić, asking the pope for aid (see Serb Uprising of 1596–97). Owing to his activities for planning a Serbian revolt, he was arrested and put on trial in Istanbul in 1612. He was found guilty of treason and was executed two years later (1614).

Title
"Archbishop of Peć and Patriarch of all Serbs and Bulgarians and Western Regions", 20 July 1611.

References

Sources

External links
 Official site of the Serbian Orthodox Church: Serbian Archbishops and Patriarchs

16th-century Serbian people
17th-century Serbian people
16th-century Eastern Orthodox archbishops
17th-century Eastern Orthodox archbishops
Patriarchs of the Serbian Orthodox Church
Serbian military leaders
16th-century births
1614 deaths
Ottoman Serbia
Ottoman period in the history of Montenegro
Ottoman period in the history of Bosnia and Herzegovina
History of the Serbian Orthodox Church
16th-century people from the Ottoman Empire
17th-century people from the Ottoman Empire